Natalia Cordova-Buckley (born November 25, 1982) is a Mexican-American actress. She is best known for starring as Elena "Yo-Yo" Rodriguez / Slingshot in the ABC superhero drama series Marvel's Agents of S.H.I.E.L.D. (2013–2020).

Early life
Cordova-Buckley was born in Mexico City and raised in Cancún. Her grandfather was Pancho Córdova, an actor in Mexican and American cinema, whom she never met.

Cordova-Buckley was classically trained as a ballet dancer, training under Fernando Alonso in the dance company Centro de Arte Siglo XXI. Finding the occupation too restricting, she decided to become an actress instead. She had reconsidered acting after trying to avoid it due to being teased about her voice in her youth. She stated: "the kids wouldn’t chase me around when we played tag because they would say that I screamed like a Godzilla. It wasn’t just my voice, but [also] the fact that I have a pretty strong personality and was always very outspoken and opinionated."

At the age of 17, she moved to the U.S. after getting accepted to the drama department of the University of North Carolina School of the Arts, a high school program for seniors in fine arts. After graduating, she attended the theatre conservatory at the California Institute of the Arts.

Career
Cordova-Buckley made her acting debut in Mexican comedy-drama series Los simuladores (2008–2009). This was followed by supporting roles in numerous Spanish-language films, such as Sucedió en un día (2010) and Lluvia de Luna (2011). She earned her first major leading role in the drama  film Ventanas al mar (2012), opposite veteran actors Charo López and Fernando Guillén.

Cordova-Buckley earned her first American acting role in the sports drama film McFarland, USA (2015), opposite Kevin Costner. She almost quit acting before winning the role of Elena "Yo-Yo" Rodriguez in the ABC superhero drama series Marvel's Agents of S.H.I.E.L.D. (2013–2020), gaining further recognition in the process. During the series' fourth season, she headlined a 6-episode miniseries, Slingshot, which debuted online on December 13, 2016. The series was nominated for the Primetime Emmy Award for Outstanding Short Form Comedy or Drama Series.

In 2017, she guest starred as attorney Julia Ramos in the A&E horror drama series Bates Motel, where she worked opposite Vera Farmiga and Freddie Highmore. Also that year, she voiced the role of artist Frida Kahlo in the Disney-Pixar animated musical film Coco, which went on to win the Academy Award for Best Animated Feature.

In 2018, Cordova-Buckley portrayed Det. Gavras in the crime thriller film Destroyer, opposite Nicole Kidman.

Personal life
Cordova-Buckley has been married to musician and actor Brian Buckley since 2011. Together, the couple reside in Los Angeles with their two dogs, Lorca and Bukowski.

One of her inspirations and role models was artist Frida Kahlo, whom she portrayed in Coco.

Filmography

Film

Television

References

External links

1982 births
Living people
Actresses from Mexico City
American film actresses
American television actresses
Mexican emigrants to the United States
21st-century American women